Kim Yeon-jung (Hangul: 김연정), known professionally as Kenzie, is a South Korean songwriter and record producer who signed under SM Entertainment. She has composed, arranged and written mostly songs for SM artists such as BoA, Isak N Jiyeon, Super Junior, The Grace, TVXQ, Girls' Generation, Shinee, f(x), Exo, Red Velvet, SuperM, and NCT, as well as non-SM acts such as Twice, CIX, and The Boyz.

Biography
Kim is a '99 Alumna of Berklee College of Music, having majored in music production and engineering (MP&E). She moved to the US to further her studies though her goal was still to be a music producer and composer in her native country, South Korea. Although she had been trained in classical music and knew how to play piano and trumpet, she had acquainted herself with the pop scene, and through the knowledge of the success of S.M. Entertainment groups like S.E.S. and H.O.T., she set herself a goal to work with S.M., which she accomplished after graduating and meeting the CEO Lee Soo-man himself.

Her favorite songs of her own are the top selling number 1 hits, BoA's "My Name" and Girls' Generation's debut song "Into The New World",  "Oh!" ,  alongside f(x)'s debut song "La Cha Ta". For future goals, she wants to expand her horizons in the music field and work with American and European artists to further explore and showcase the multi-cultural sound of her music, which includes Western and Eastern influences.

In 2018, she was also in charge of arranging the debut song for girl-group Nature under n.CH Entertainment titled "Allegro Cantabile". It was a remake of the anime opening title song "Nodame Cantabile".

Songwriting discography

References

External links
 SMTown Official Site

SM Entertainment people
South Korean pop musicians
South Korean composers
1976 births
Living people
Berklee College of Music alumni
People from Shimane Prefecture